The 1984 season was the Chicago Bears' 65th in the National Football League the 15th post-season completed in the NFL, and their third under head coach Mike Ditka. The team improved from their 8–8 record from 1983, to a 10–6 record, earning them a spot in the NFL playoffs. The Bears went on to lose in the NFC Championship Game 23–0 to the eventual Super Bowl Champion San Francisco 49ers.

This was the first of five consecutive NFC Central titles for the Bears. They opened their 1984 training camp in a new location, Platteville, Wisconsin as head coach Mike Ditka needed his team to get away from any distractions they might face at home. The team was on the verge of discovering a group of young leaders for the first time, and began to show the dominating defense that would emerge in full the following season, and pushed much farther than anyone expected them to go.

Chicago opened the season by routing the Tampa Bay Buccaneers, 34–14. In Week Two, they shut out the Denver Broncos 27–0 behind a huge day from star running back Walter Payton. This game featured a famous image from Payton's career: a 50+ yard run down the sideline, led by 2nd-year guard Mark Bortz, an 8th round draft pick that was converted from defensive tackle.

In Week Three, they were without the services of starting quarterback Jim McMahon at Green Bay, reserve quarterback Bob Avellini took the reins. Chicago's offense performed inferiorly but still managed a 9–7 victory. This contest marked the first meeting between Mike Ditka and Packers head coach Forrest Gregg. It would be a rivalry that would go down in history as arguably the dirtiest era in Chicago-Green Bay football.

In Week Four, the Bears' lack of offensive power was evident as they lost to the Seattle Seahawks 38–9. After this loss, Ditka cut Avellini. The following week, the Bears lost to the Dallas Cowboys 23–14, bringing their record to 3–2.

On October 7, 1984, Walter Payton reached a major milestone as he surpassed Jim Brown as the game's all-time leading rusher in yards, he did it in the third quarter of a Week Six home game against the New Orleans Saints. The Bears beat the Saints 20–7. Incidentally, the 1984 Bears ran for the second-most rushing attempts in a season, with 674.

In Week Seven, the Bears lost 38–21 to the Cardinals in St. Louis the following week. Sitting at 4–3, the Bears proceeded to win three in a row. They beat Tampa Bay 44–9, then Minnesota Vikings at home, 16–7. Following the win over the Minnesota Vikings, came the biggest challenge for the Bears: a showdown with the defending world champion Los Angeles Raiders. The Bears beat the Raiders 17–6, a game that showcased Richard Dent, who collected three sacks against Raiders QB Marc Wilson. Dent would finish with 17.5 sacks, third-most for the season behind Mark Gastineau and Andre Tippett. The Bears would then record 72 sacks, an NFL record. The Bears' victory was marred by a kidney laceration suffered by Jim McMahon, ending his season.

Six-year veteran QB Steve Fuller had been acquired from the Los Angeles Rams prior to the 1984 season for insurance in case McMahon was injured. The investment paid off, as Fuller guided the Bears to a 2–1 record over the next 3 games. In the third game at Minnesota's new Hubert H. Humphrey Metrodome in Week Thirteen, the team clinched its first NFC Central Division title.

After the Minnesota game, Fuller was injured, and Chicago was faced with another quarterback problem. Ineffective Rusty Lisch replaced the injured Fuller and lost the Week Fourteen game at San Diego, then started the following week against Green Bay at home. Lisch was again ineffective, so Ditka inserted none other than Walter Payton behind center in the shotgun formation. Payton, unsurprisingly, was ineffective as well, and the Bears lost to the Packers 20–14.

Fuller was expected to return by the playoffs, but Ditka did not want to enter the postseason with another loss. The Bears signed 14-year journeyman Greg Landry to start his last NFL game against his previous team, the Detroit Lions, in the season finale. The Bears won 30–13, and were headed to the playoffs for the first time since 1979.

1984 NFL Draft

Preseason

Regular season

Schedule

Standings

Game summaries

Week 2: vs. Denver Broncos
The Bears limited the Broncos to 130 total yards as three different Denver quarterbacks (John Elway, Gary Kubiak, and Scott Stankavage) completed just nine passes with two interceptions. Seven different Bears players led by Walter Payton rushed for 302 yards.

Week 3: at Green Bay Packers

Week 4: at Seattle Seahawks

Six Bears turnovers and a 21-0 run by the Seahawks in the 3rd quarter were the key as Chicago's season-opening win streak was blunted, 38-9. The two teams combined for just 504 yards of offense with 22 penalties eating up 181 yards.

Week 5: vs. Dallas Cowboys

Mike Ditka for the first time as Bears head coach faced Tom Landry, who'd coached Ditka in Super Bowl VI. Landry's Cowboys were outgained in yardage 400 to 313 but forced two Bears turnovers to win 23-14. The Bears rushing attack still managed 283 yards.

Week 6: vs. New Orleans Saints

Walter Payton ran for 154 yards and a touchdown on his way to breaking Jim Brown's career rushing yardage and 100-yard games records.

Week 9: vs. Minnesota Vikings

Week 10: vs. Los Angeles Raiders

Week 13

Bears clinch division title

Week 15: vs. Green Bay Packers

Postseason
See full article, 1984–85 NFL playoffs

The first-round matchup sent the 10–6 Bears to Washington, a team that had lost to the Los Angeles Raiders in Super Bowl XVIII. Washington was heavily favored, but Chicago came away with a 23–19 victory that featured touchdown passes from Fuller, as well as Payton on a halfback option pass.

With the momentum of defeating the defending NFC champions, the Bears then travelled to San Francisco for their first appearance in a championship game of any sort since their championship year in 1963. The line for the game came down steadily as the week wore on, but the Bears were shut out 23–0. Fuller had performed poorly in games against tough opponents, and the offense sputtered as the 49ers were able to render Walter Payton ineffective. The team had gone farther than many had expected them to go in 1984, and the season set the stage for their Super Bowl winning 1985 season.

Schedule

NFC Divisional Playoff (Sunday, December 30, 1984): at Washington Redskins

NFC Championship Game (Sunday, January 6, 1985): at San Francisco 49ers 

Point spread: 49ers by 10
 Over/Under: 40.0 (under)
 Time of Game:

Roster and staff

Staff

Roster

References

External links

1984 Chicago Bears Season at www.bearshistory.com

NFC Central championship seasons
Chicago Bears
Chicago Bears seasons
Chicago